In construction or renovation, underpinning is the process of strengthening the foundation of an existing building or other structure.  Underpinning may be necessary for a variety of reasons:
 The original foundation isn't strong or stable enough.
 The usage of the structure has changed.
 The properties of the soil supporting the foundation may have changed (possibly through subsidence) or were mischaracterized during design.
 The construction of nearby structures necessitates the excavation of soil supporting existing foundations.
 To increase the depth or load capacity of existing foundations to support the addition of another storey to the building (above or below grade).
 It is more economical, due to land price or otherwise, to work on the present structure's foundation than to build a new one.
 Earthquake, flood, drought or other natural causes have caused the structure to move, requiring stabilisation of foundation soils and/or footings.

Underpinning may be accomplished by extending the foundation in depth or breadth so it either rests on a more supportive soil stratum or distributes its load across a greater area. Use of micropiles and jet grouting are common methods in underpinning. An alternative to underpinning is the strengthening of the soil by the introduction of a grout, including expanding urethane-based engineered structural resins.

Underpinning may be necessary where P class (problem) soils in certain areas of the site are encountered.

Through semantic change the word underpinning has evolved to encompass all abstract concepts that serve as a foundation.

Mass concrete  underpinning
'Traditional underpinning,' the mass concrete underpinning method is nearly 100 years in age, and the protocol has not changed. This underpinning method strengthens an existing structure's foundation by digging boxes by hand underneath and sequentially pouring concrete in a strategic order, accompanied by reinforcements if appropriate.  The result is a foundation built underneath the existing foundation. This underpinning method is generally applied when the existing foundation is at a shallow depth, but works well up to fifty feet (fifteen meters) deep. Hand tools such as shovels and post hole diggers are used; heavy machinery is not employed in this method due to the small size of the boxes being dug.  There are several advantages to using this method of underpinning, including the simplicity of the engineering, lower cost of labor, and the continuity of the structure's use during construction.

Beam and base underpinning
The beam and base method of underpinning is a more technically advanced adaptation of traditional mass concrete underpinning. A reinforced concrete beam is constructed below, above or in replacement of the existing footing. The beam then transfers the load of the building to mass concrete bases, which are constructed at designed strategic locations. Base sizes and depths are dependent upon the prevailing ground conditions. Beam design is dependent upon the configuration of the building and the applied loads. Anti-heave precautions are often incorporated in schemes where potential expansion of clay soils may occur.

Mini-piled underpinning
Mini-piles have the greatest use where ground conditions are variable, where access is restrictive, where environmental pollution aspects are significant, and where structural movements in service must be minimal. Structural engineers will use rigs which are specifically designed to operate in environments with restricted headroom and limited space, and can gain access through a regular domestic doorway. The technique of minipiling was first applied in Italy in 1952, and has gone through many different names, reflecting worldwide acceptance and expiration of the original patents.
The relatively small diameter of mini-piles is distinctive of this type of underpinning and generally uses anchoring or tie backs into an existing structure or rock.  Conventional drilling and grouting methods are used for this method of underpinning.  These mini-piles have a high slenderness ratio, feature substantial steel reinforcing elements and can sustain axial loading in both senses.  The working loads of mini-piles can sustain up to  loads.
In comparison to Mass Concrete Underpinning, the engineering aspect of mini-piles is somewhat more involved, including rudimentary engineering mechanics such as statics and strength of materials.  These mini-piles must be designed to work in tension and compression, depending on the orientation and application of the design.  In detail, attention with design must be paid analytically to settlement, bursting, buckling, cracking, and interface consideration, whereas, from a practical viewpoint, corrosion resistance, and compatibility with the existing ground and structure must be regarded.

Mini-piled underpinning schemes
Mini-piled underpinning schemes include pile and beam, cantilever pile-caps and piled raft systems. Cantilevered pile-caps are usually used to avoid disturbing the inside of a building, and require the construction of tension and compression piles to each cap. These are normally linked by a beam. The pile and beam system usually involves constructing pairs of piles on either side of the wall and linking them with a pile cap to support the wall. The pile caps are usually linked by reinforced concrete beams to support the entire length of the wall. Piled raft underpinning systems are commonly used when an entire building needs to be underpinned. The internal floors are completely removed, a grid of piles is installed, and a reinforced concrete raft is then constructed over the complete floor level, picking up and fully supporting all external and internal walls.

Expanding resin injection, an alternative to underpinning
A mix of structural resins and hardener is injected into foundation ground beneath footings. On entering the ground the resin and hardener mix and expansion occurs due to a chemical reaction. The expanding structural resin mix fills any voids and crevices, compacts any weak soil and then, if the injection is continued, the structure above may be raised and re-levelled. This relatively new method of underpinning has been in existence for approximately 30 years, and because it does not involve any construction or excavation set-up, is known to be a clean, fast and non-disruptive underpinning method.

Gallery

References

External links
 An illustration of a Bell Bottom Pier used for underpinning and support. 
 An explanation of the Underpinning process with pictures. 

Building engineering
Foundations (buildings and structures)